The original Mount Baker Hard Core (MBHC) consisted of Craig Kelly, Jeff Fulton and Dan Donnelly, whom were a tight squad of snowboarders coming from Mount Vernon, Washington, also included Eric Swanson, Swany, Eric Janko, Carter Turk, and eventually Mike Ranquet, Mike Devenport (Tex), Jaime Lynn, Dan Donnelly, and Bryan "little b" Hartman.are considered MBHCs. Kind of a little snow tribe that possessed a family feel or brotherhood, for a brief period, snowboarding at Mount Baker Ski Area during the early and mid-1980s.

Other notable Pro or Sponsored Mt. Baker snowboarders from the era include: Jason Bass, Marcela Dobis, Gillian Kelly, and Amy Howat. See also the so-called "Shitty Kids" crew from Bellingham, Washington: Shane Briggs, James Klinedinst, Chris Rosinski, Steve Purtill, Chris Todd, and Ben Todd.

In 1991 a snowboarding video called "Baked" the MBHC' was released on VHS which included most of the MBHC and friends.

References
Frozen in Time the Mount Baker Hardcore Snowboarder – ISSUE 25.1 AUGUST 2012

Snowboarding in the United States
Mount Vernon, Washington